Aishwarya Innovative PU College is a pre-university college in Mandya, Karnataka, India. It is affiliated to Karnataka Pre-University Education Board. It is located at HKV Nagar, Maddur.

Courses 
The courses offered for PUC are

1. PCMB - Physics, Chemistry, Mathematics, Biology
2. PCMC - Physics, Chemistry, Mathematics, Computer Science

References

Pre University colleges in Karnataka
Schools in Mandya district